Protein ENED is a protein that in humans is encoded by the FAM198B gene.

References

External links

Further reading